"Fake Empire" is a song by Brooklyn-based indie rock band The National from their fourth studio album, Boxer. The song was released in June 2008 as the album's third and final single.

Production
"Fake Empire" was written by Bryce Dessner of The National. Commenting on the song's initial concept, he said, "Conceptually I said I would love to write a song that was based on a certain polyrhythm, the four-over-three pattern, which is what you hear in the piano. It's something I, personally, have never heard in rock music. What's interesting is the song sounds like it's in four, but it's in three. The harmonies and the way I'm playing the piano music are actually incredibly simple – sort of like "Chopsticks" simple – with this really weird rhythm. At the end we said, 'Oh, wouldn't it be cool if we had a horn fanfare?' so Padma [Newsome] wrote this very Steve Reichian minimalist horn fanfare."

Lyrical Interpretation
Lyrically, "Fake Empire" is a commentary about a generation lost to disillusion and apathy. Vocalist Matt Berninger further explained to The Quietus that it is about "where you can't deal with the reality of what's really going on, so let's just pretend that the world's full of bluebirds and ice skating."

Promotion
The National made their network television debut when they performed "Fake Empire" on the Late Show with David Letterman on July 24, 2007. In the television series Chuck, the song appeared in the episode "Chuck Versus the Break-up" on October 13, 2008. "Fake Empire" also played during the final scene of the pilot episode of NBC's police drama Southland, as well as over the concluding scene and credits of the 2008 film Battle in Seattle. An instrumental version of the song was featured in Barack Obama's campaign video "Signs of Hope and Change" during his 2008 United States presidential campaign, and the song was also played at the 2008 Democratic National Convention. The members of The National supported the presidential candidate; they put Obama's face on a fundraising T-shirt with the text "Mr. November", taken from the name of a song from the band's third album, Alligator. In the fifth season premiere episode of the teen drama television series One Tree Hill, several songs by The National were featured, including "Fake Empire". It was also featured in Person of Interest, at the end of the episode Sotto Voce, 9th episode of the 5th season.  Season 1 episode 6 of Feel Good, a Netflix series, featured this song.

Reception
Allmusic considered "Fake Empire" one of The National's best songs, and described it as a song that "begins as a dead-of-night ballad that echoes Leonard Cohen, then peppy brass and guitars turn it into something joyous." Mark Mordue of WAToday called "Fake Empire" "one of the great rock'n'roll songs" of 2007. He described it as "a romantic-sounding tune marked by a quiet declaration that 'We're half awake in a fake empire,' [which] married the lonely-guy blues of a New York night to a veiled critique of American imperialism. In short, it expressed the feelings of being lost inside a dream." Stylus Magazine ranked "Fake Empire" as the 7th-best song of 2007.

Track listing
DL and promo CD (BBQ 417)
 "Fake Empire" – 3:27
 "Without Permission" – 3:37
 "Fake Empire" (Live) – 3:42

Personnel
Matt Berninger - vocals
Aaron Dessner - guitar
Bryce Dessner - guitar, piano
Bryan Devendorf - drums, percussion
Scott Devendorf - bass
Additional Musicians
Tim Albright - trombone
Thomas Bartlett - keyboards
CJ Camerieri - trumpet
Marla Hansen - backing vocals
Jeb Wallace - French horn

Cover versions

 Danny Seim of Menomena recorded a cover of the song in 2008 for his solo project, Lackthereof, on the album Your Anchor.
 Ryan Lewis also released a song called "Fake Empire" on the album The VS. [Redux] in 2010 together with Macklemore. It samples the "Fake Empire" refrain, therefore making it a remix rather than a cover.
 Anna-Lynne Williams released a version of the song as Lotte Kestner on her 2011 album Stolen.

 Molly Tuttle, recorded a cover of the song on her …but I’d rather be with you album, released in 2020

References

External links
 The National official website

2008 singles
The National (band) songs
2007 songs
Beggars Banquet Records singles
Songs written by Matt Berninger